The 1968 Montana Grizzlies football team represented the University of Montana in the 1968 NCAA College Division football season as a member of the Big Sky Conference (Big Sky). The Grizzlies were led by second-year head coach Jack Swarthout, played their home games at Dornblaser Field, and finished the season with a record of two wins and seven losses (2–7, 0–4 in Big Sky, last).

Schedule

References

External links
Montana Grizzlies football – 1968 media guide

Montana
Montana Grizzlies football seasons
Montana Grizzlies football